The 2013 Mobil 1 SportsCar Grand Prix was an auto racing event held at Canadian Tire Motorsports Park, Bowmanville, Ontario, Canada from July 19–21, 2013  The race was the fifth round of the 2013 American Le Mans Series season.  Muscle Milk Pickett Racing, with drivers Klaus Graf and Lucas Luhr, extended their streak of season victories to four by earning a win with a four lap gap over second place and P2 class winners Level 5 Motorsports.  CORE Autosport led the PC category, while Corvette Racing scored their third victory of the season in the GT class.  Alex Job Racing won the GTC category, two weeks after badly damaging their car at the previous event in Lime Rock.

Qualifying
In qualifying for the PC category, a crash by Mike Gausch forced the session to be stopped.  Due to not completing a minimum of ten minutes, the qualifying results for PC were nullified and the grid order was set by championship points.  As a result of PC cars requiring a separate grid order, the final race grid was altered so that cars in the same category were grouped together, even if outqualified by a car from another class.

Qualifying result
Pole position winners in each class are marked in bold.

Race

Race result
Class winners in bold.  Cars failing to complete 70% of their class winner's distance are marked as Not Classified (NC).

References

External links
 2013 SportsCar Grand Prix Race Broadcast (American Le Mans Series YouTube Channel)

2013 American Le Mans Series
2013 in Canadian motorsport
2013 in Ontario
July 2013 sports events in Canada
2013